Cophixalus ornatus, commonly known as the ornate nursery-frog, is a species of frog in the family Microhylidae. It is endemic to north-eastern Queensland, Australia.

References

ornatus
Amphibians described in 1912
Frogs of Australia